Peter Borthwick (13 September 1804 – 18 December 1852) was a British Conservative Party politician and newspaper editor.

Early life
Peter Borthwick was born in Cairnbank, Borthwick, Midlothian, on 13 September 1804, the son of Thomas Borthwick. He was educated at school in Penicuik and at the University of Edinburgh, where he was the private pupil of the future Bishop of Edinburgh and Primus of the Scottish Episcopal Church, Professor James Walker. In 1828 he was admitted as a pensioner at Jesus College, Cambridge, whence he migrated to Downing College as a fellow-commoner two years later. He did not receive a degree.

Political career
Borthwick first came to attention through his staunch opposition to the abolition of slavery, which attracted the attention and thanks of various slave owners and Conservative Associations. In 1833 he was appointed by the West India Association to defend slavery in debates in Glasgow with the abolitionist George Thompson.

He was MP for Evesham from 1835 to 1837 and again from 1841 to 1847. In between, from 1837 to 1841, the MP for Evesham was Sir George Rushout (later Baron Northwick) of Northwick Park, Worcestershire. These two gentlemen fought one of the last duels in England on 8 May 1838 over the disputed election of 1837.

He was an outspoken defender of Don Carlos' Durango Decree, which excluded the mercenary British Auxiliary Legion from the terms of the Eliot Convention, and also of British subjects who fought in the Carlist ranks.

Publishing career
Borthwick was editor of The Morning Post from 1848 until his death in 1852. This paper was noted for its outspoken support of Lord Palmerston's foreign policy.

Later life
Borthwick died on 18 December 1852 and is buried in the Church of the Holy Trinity in Brompton, but has a memorial on the tomb of his wife Margaret in Brompton Cemetery, London. The grave lies at the eastmost end of the main east–west path.

Personal life
He married Margaret Colville, who died on 13 November 1864, aged 59 years.

Their son was Algernon Borthwick, 1st Baron Glenesk, who took over as editor of The Morning Post on the death of his father.

References

External links 

1804 births
1852 deaths
Alumni of the University of Edinburgh
Alumni of Jesus College, Cambridge
Burials at Brompton Cemetery
Conservative Party (UK) MPs for English constituencies
English newspaper editors
English male journalists
UK MPs 1835–1837
UK MPs 1837–1841
UK MPs 1841–1847
19th-century British people
19th-century British journalists
English male non-fiction writers